The 2019 Kentuckiana Ford Dealers ARCA 200 was the third stock car race of the 2019 ARCA Menards Series season and the 24th iteration of the event. The race was held on Sunday, April 14, 2019, in Salem, Indiana at Salem Speedway, a 0.555 miles (0.893 km) permanent paved oval-shaped racetrack. The race was shortened from its scheduled 200 laps to 101 laps due to rain. Venturini Motorsports driver Michael Self would dominate the race until the caution came out on lap 98, with the race being officially called three laps later. The race was Self's fifth career ARCA Menards Series win, his second of the season, and his second consecutive win. To fill out the podium, Sam Mayer of GMS Racing and Carson Hocevar of KBR Development would finish second and third, respectively.

Background 
Salem Speedway is a .555 miles (0.893 km) long paved oval motor racetrack in Washington Township, Washington County, near Salem, Indiana, approximately 100 miles (160 km) south of Indianapolis. The track has 33° degrees of banking in the corners. Major auto racing series that run at Salem are ARCA and USAC.

Entry list

Practice 
The only 90-minute practice session was held on Saturday, April 13, at 11:00 AM EST.

Qualifying 
Qualifying was held on Saturday, April 13, at 3:00 PM EST. Each driver would have two laps to set a fastest time; the fastest of the two would count as their official qualifying lap.

Full qualifying results

Race results

References 

2019 ARCA Menards Series
April 2019 sports events in the United States
2019 in sports in Indiana